Henrietta Antonia Clive, Countess of Powis (née Herbert; 3 September 1758 – 3 June 1830), was a British writer, mineral collector, and botanist. Her time in India, while her husband was Governor of Madras, was inspirational to her for all three of these pursuits.

Early life and background 

Born in Oakly Park, at Bromfield, Shropshire, into a landed and titled family, she was the daughter of Henry Herbert, 1st Earl of Powis, and Barbara Herbert, granddaughter of William Herbert, 2nd Marquess of Powis. Her family owned a property in London and significant estates in Wales and Shropshire. Her birthplace was sold to Robert Clive, 1st Baron Clive, in 1771, so Lady Henrietta spent her teenage years at the family's ancestral home, Powis Castle.

Mineral collection and botany 

In 1798, Henrietta's husband, Lord Clive, was appointed Governor of Madras. Lady Clive followed him to India where she started collecting rocks and minerals, as the first aristocratic woman to pursue that hobby. As her collection was growing, Lady Clive contacted prominent collectors and mineral dealers, such as James Sowerby, John MacCulloch and the Countess of Aylesford. Her records show that many specimens had been given to her by her children. The minerals in Lady Clive's collection, numbering up to 1,000, are arranged systematically by chemistry, as was usual in the early 19th century. In 1817, she organised her collection in two handwritten catalogues, using numbers to identify each specimen and helping the collection remain remarkably complete to this day. A quarter of the original collection is now kept at the National Museum Wales as one of the most important historic mineral collections, having been donated by her great-grandson, George Herbert, 4th Earl of Powis, in 1929.

Upon arriving in India, Lady Powis also created a garden and kept a record of the plants in the area of Mysore and the Carnatic region.

Writing
Lady Clive's journals are one of the first written accounts of India by a British woman. Published in the 2010 edited collection Birds of Passage: Henrietta Clive's Travels in South India 1798-1801, they were an important milestone in the emergence of female travel writers and their ascension to the level of their male counterparts.

Marriage and issue 
Lady Henrietta married Lord Clive's eldest son and heir, Edward Clive, 1st Baron Clive, in 1784. The marriage was beneficial to both families; the bride's family had a prestigious name but considerable debts, while the groom accrued wealth built during Clive's military campaigns in India. The couple settled in Walcot Hall, at Lydbury North, near Bishop's Castle, Shropshire. Their four children were:

 Lady Henrietta Antonia Herbert (d. 1835); married Sir Watkin Williams-Wynn, 5th Baronet had issue.
 Edward Herbert, 2nd Earl of Powis (1785–1848)
 Lady Charlotte Florentia Herbert (1787–1866); married Hugh Percy, 3rd Duke of Northumberland, and was the governess of the future Queen Victoria.
 Robert Henry Clive (1798–1854); a politician.

Lady Clive inherited the Herbert estates upon the death of her brother, George Herbert, 2nd Earl of Powis, in 1801, when the earldom became extinct. Three years later, it was recreated in favour of her husband, making her Countess of Powis.

Death 
The Countess of Powis died at Walcot Hall in 1830 aged 71 and was buried at Bromfield Parish Church, near Oakley Park.  Her husband survived her, dying in 1839.

References

Further reading 
Shields, Nancy K., Birds of Passage: Henrietta Clive's Travels in South India 1798–1801 (Eland, 2010).

External links 
The Noble Family of Clive

1758 births
1830 deaths
British countesses
Natural history collectors
British collectors
Scientists from Shropshire
Women collectors
Daughters of British earls
Clive-Herbert family
Herbert family
Writers from Shropshire